Majority (Persian: بی همه چیز, romanized: Bi Hameh Chiz) is a 2021 Iranian drama film directed by Mohsen Gharaie and written by Mohammad Davoudi and Gharaie based on Friedrich Dürrenmatt's play The Visit. The film screened for the first time at the 39th Fajr Film Festival and received 5 Awards and 9 nominations.

The film was released on December 15, 2021, in Iran theatrically.

Premise 
A remote village has not had a previous boom for years. Residents have either been forced to migrate or are in poverty and misery, but the village has a new guest. But the village has a new guest who was born here. Twenty years have passed since her migration, she is wealthy, and the people dream that he has come to save the village from this misery.

Cast 

 Parviz Parastui as Amir
 Hedieh Tehrani as Lily Nazarian
 Hadi Hejazifar as Javaldouz
 Baran Kosari as Noori
 Babak Karimi as Doctor
 Pedram Sharifi as Teacher
 Laleh Marzban as Asieh
 Mahtab Nasirpour as Nasrin
 Farid Sajjadi Hosseini as Mehdi Dashtki
 Erfan Naseri
 Mohsen Noori
 Khosro Pesyani
 Mehdi Sabaghi
 Zahir Yari
 Eisa Yousefipour

Reception

Accolades

References

External links 

 

2020s Persian-language films
Iranian drama films
2021 films
Films based on works by Friedrich Dürrenmatt
2021 drama films